Eutrope Bouret (16 April 1833 in Paris – 1906) was a 19th-century French sculptor.

Eutrope Bouret was a student of Louis Buhot. He exhibited at the Salon from 1875 to 1903. He worked in conventional materials: marble, plaster, terracotta and bronze.

Works 
 Romeo and Juliet statues in French Bisque (pottery), unglazed porcelain c.1870
 Psyché au tribunal de Vénus.
 Bronze bust of Alexis Bouvier on the grave of the popular novelist at Père Lachaise Cemetery in Paris.

Bibliography 
 Emmanuel Bénézit, Dictionnaire des peintres, sculpteurs, dessinateurs et graveurs de tous les temps et de tous les pays, éditions Gründ, 1999.

19th-century French sculptors
French male sculptors
20th-century French sculptors
Artists from Paris
1833 births
1906 deaths
19th-century French male artists